Crenicichla cyanonotus is a species of cichlid native to South America. It is found in the Amazon River basin in Peru and western Brazil.

References

Kullander, S.O., 1986. Cichlid fishes of the Amazon River drainage of Peru. Department of Vertebrate Zoology, Research Division, Swedish Museum of Natural History, Stockholm, Sweden, 394 p.

cyanonotus
Freshwater fish of Brazil
Freshwater fish of Peru
Fish of the Amazon basin
Taxa named by Edward Drinker Cope
Fish described in 1870